Mariyam Sultana Noohani (Sindhi: مريم سلطانا نوحاڻي)  (19 June 1932 – 25 November 2014) was an educationist and academic leader of Hyderabad, Sindh, Pakistan. She headed All Pakistan Women Association and the Federation of Pakistan Women Organisation.  She imparted education and training especially to the girls and apprised them with the importance of schooling. She also remained associated with the Sindh Public Service Commission and the Sindh University as a subject expert. She served as Director of College Education of Hyderabad Region. She is popularly known as "Apa Mariyam Noohani" where Apa means "Elder Sister".

Childhood and education 
Mariyam Noohani was born on 19 June 1932 in Hyderabad Sindh, Pakistan. Her father's name was Rais Ghulam Qadir Khan Noohani who was a landlord and journalist. She had one brother and one sister. She received her primary education from New Model Girls School Gari Khato Hyderabad and passed matriculation from Maderatul Banat Girls High School Hyderabad. She also earned B.A. (Hons) in Muslim History and M.A. in Islamic Culture from University of Sindh.

Career 
She started her career as a lecturer of Islamic History at Government Girls College Hyderabad in 1953. She was promoted as an Assistant Professor in 1958. From 24 April 1970 to 21 May 1971 she served as Principal of Government Girls College Sukkur. From May 1971 to October 1972 she was a subject specialist at the Bureau of Curriculum Jamshoro. From October 1972 to October 1973 she was appointed as a Professor and Principal of Government Girls College Sukkur. From 8 May 1974 to 3 May 1983 she served as Deputy Director College Education of Hyderabad region and on 26 September 1996 she joined as Director of College Education of Hyderabad region. She also served as Principal of Zubeda Girls College Hyderabad from 1983 to 1990.

On 26 June 2014, she inaugurated a library named after her at the Govt Zubeda Girls College, which she headed as principal.

Death 
She died of cardiac arrest on 25 November 2014.

References 

 Sindhi people
 1932 births
 2014 deaths
Pakistani school principals and headteachers
 Pakistani women academics
 People from Hyderabad, Sindh